Manchester Grand Hyatt San Diego is a high-rise hotel complex in San Diego, in the U.S. state of California, composed of two towers. The towers are the third- and ninth-tallest buildings in the city. Developed by Doug Manchester and owned by Host Hotels & Resorts, the taller tower is the tallest building on the waterfront on the West Coast, and with 1,628 rooms, it is Southern California's largest hotel. Because of its proximity to the waterfront, as well as its amenities, the Manchester Grand Hyatt is referred to as a spa and resort.

Description
The Manchester Grand Hyatt consists of two towers, the 40-story Harbor Tower built in 1992 and the 33-story Seaport Tower which was added in 2003. Starting in 2012, all of the guest rooms and suites had a complete renovation when the property was transferred to new ownership. A four-story building with a rooftop pool connects the towers to each other. The hotel's 1,628 guest rooms each have partial water or city views, and many offer views of the Pacific Ocean.

The hotel has three bars: the Top of the Hyatt, Brew 30, and the Grand Lobby Bar. The third floor holds a spa & salon with its own private pool and the fourth floor holds the general swimming pool, whirlpools, and sun decks for all guests.

Top of the Hyatt
The 40th and top floor of the Manchester Grand Hyatt is known as the "Top of the Hyatt", a bar with views of San Diego, Coronado Island, and Mexico. The bar was awarded the title of "Best Upscale Bar" by SignOnSanDiego."

Location
The Manchester Grand Hyatt is located on the Marina's waterfront.

See also
List of tallest buildings in San Diego

References

External links

Manchester Grand Hyatt homepage

Residential buildings completed in 1992
Skyscraper hotels in San Diego
Hyatt Hotels and Resorts
Hotels established in 1992
Hotel buildings completed in 1992